Ivughli Rural District is in Ivughli District of Khoy County, West Azerbaijan province, Iran. At the National Census of 2006, its population was 8,413 in 2,131 households. There were 8,489 inhabitants in 2,418 households at the following census of 2011. At the most recent census of 2016, the population of the rural district was 7,303 in 2,326 households. The largest of its 83 villages was Siah Baz, with 2,045 people.

References 

Khoy County

Rural Districts of West Azerbaijan Province

Populated places in West Azerbaijan Province

Populated places in Khoy County